Ceftobiprole (Zevtera/Mabelio) is a fifth-generation cephalosporin for the treatment of hospital-acquired pneumonia (excluding ventilator-associated pneumonia) and community-acquired pneumonia. It is marketed by Basilea Pharmaceutica in the United Kingdom, Germany, Switzerland and Austria under the trade name Zevtera, in France and Italy under the trade name Mabelio. Like other cephalosporins, ceftobiprole exerts its antibacterial activity by binding to important penicillin-binding proteins and inhibiting their transpeptidase activity which is essential for the synthesis of bacterial cell walls.  Ceftobiprole has high affinity for penicillin-binding protein 2a of methicillin-resistant Staphylococcus aureus strains and retains its activity against strains that express divergent mecA gene homologues (mecC or mecALGA251). Ceftobiprole also binds to penicillin-binding protein 2b in Streptococcus pneumoniae (penicillin-intermediate), to penicillin-binding protein 2x in Streptococcus pneumoniae (penicillin-resistant), and to penicillin-binding protein 5 in Enterococcus faecalis.

Microbiology 
Ceftobiprole has shown in vitro antimicrobial activity against a broad range of Gram-positive and Gram-negative pathogens. Among the Gram-positive pathogens, ceftobiprole has demonstrated good in vitro activity against methicillin-resistant Staphylococcus aureus, methicillin-susceptible Staphylococcus aureus and coagulase-negative staphylococci, as well as against strains of methicillin-resistant Staphylococcus aureus with reduced susceptibility to linezolid, daptomycin or vancomycin. Ceftobiprole has also displayed potent activity against Streptococcus pneumoniae (including penicillin-sensitive, penicillin-resistant and ceftriaxone-resistant strains) and Enterococcus faecalis, but not against Enterococcus faecium. For Gram-negative pathogens, ceftobiprole has shown good in vitro activity against Haemophilus influenzae (including both ampicillin-susceptible and ampicillin-non-susceptible isolates), Pseudomonas aeruginosa and strains of Escherichia coli, Klebsiella pneumoniae and Proteus mirabilis that do not produce extended-spectrum β-lactamases (ESBL). Like all other cephalosporins, ceftobiprole was inactive against strains that produce extended-spectrum β-lactamases.

The efficacy of ceftobiprole has been demonstrated in two large randomized, double-blind, phase 3 clinical trials in patients with hospital-acquired and community-acquired pneumonia. Ceftobiprole was non-inferior to ceftazidime plus linezolid in the treatment of hospital-acquired pneumonia (excluding ventilator-acquired pneumonia) and non-inferior to ceftriaxone with or without linezolid in the treatment of community-acquired pneumonia.

Pharmacology

Ceftobiprole is the active moiety of the prodrug ceftobiprole medocaril and is available for intravenous treatment only. The recommended dose is 500 mg as 2-hour infusion every 8 hours. It is mainly excreted renally. Dose adjustment is required for patients with moderate or severe renal impairment and for patients with end-stage renal disease, but no dose adjustment is needed by gender, ethnicity or age, in severely obese patients or in patients with hepatic impairment.

Regulatory approvals

Ceftobiprole has been approved for the treatment of adult patients with hospital acquired pneumonia (excluding ventilator-acquired pneumonia) and community-acquired pneumonia in 12 European countries, Canada and Switzerland.

Synonyms
 RO0639141-000
 BAL9141
 Ceftobiprole medocaril

References

External links 
 

Cephalosporin antibiotics
Thiadiazoles
Ketoximes
Pyrrolidines
Pyrrolidones